This is a list of finalists for the 2021 Archibald Prize for portraiture (listed is Artist – Title). 52 artworks were selected from the 938 entries received. 2021 was the first year with gender parity among the artists. As the images are copyrighted, an external link to an image has been listed where available.

Benjamin Aitken – Gareth Sansom
 Julianne Ross Allcorn – I listen and they tell me the bush news
 Victoria Atkinson – Trent mango tree, all the colours of the rainbow, Trent
 Peter Berner – Stop pouting, you've had your turn
  – Collaborative spirits
 Natasha Bieniek – Rachel Griffiths
 Karen Black – Professor Chandini Raina Macintyre
 Keith Burt – Sarah Holland-Batt – poet
 Ann Cape – The odd little bird (a portrait of Sam, Cam and Penguin Bloom)
 Tom Carment – Mara reading, in the kitchen at Mount Lofty 
Julia Ciccarone – The sea within (Winner: People's Choice Award 2021)
Jun Chen – Artist – Joe Furlonger 
Matthew Clarke – Del Kathryn Barton is a good listener 
Lucy Culliton – Self (bogong moth jumper) 
Dagmar Cyrulla – Wendy
Jonathan Dalton – Ramesh and the artist Ramesh 
Sinead Davies – The charity worker 
Graeme Drendel – Portrait of Jill 
Jaye Early – Masato_Takasaka
Jeremy Eden – Firass 
Hong Fu – Professor Mabel Lee
Tsering Hannaford – Her Excellency the Honourable Margaret Beazley AC QC
Pat Hoffie – Visaya in a c-colour
Matthew Kentmann – Les
Xeni Kusumitra – adrift
Kim Leutwyler – Kim 
Richard Lewer – Liz Laverty 
Dapeng Liu – A mind–body dualism portrait of Joanna Capon 
Kathrin Longhurst – Kate (Winner: Packing Room Prize 2021) 
Fiona Lowry – Matthys 
Mathew Lynn – Apprentice – self-portrait with Papa K (aka I do see colour) 
Shannon McCulloch – Ben
William Mackinnon – Dark dad / extremis 
Euan Macleod – Blak Douglas
Julian Meagher – Fozzy 
James Morrison – Portrait of Timothy Vernon Moore
Sally M. Nangala Mulda – Two town camp stories 
Kirsty Neilson – Making noise 
Thea Anamara Perkins – Rachel 
James Powditch – Kerry O'Brien – all along the watch tower 
Jude Rae – Inside out 
Thom Roberts – A portriff of Adam (Shane Simpson AM) 
Joan Ross – Joan as a colonial woman looking at the future 
Sally Ross – Autoportrait 
Marikit Santiago – Filipiniana (self-portrait in collaboration with Maella Santiago Pearl) 
Kirthana Selvaraj – The green suit, a self-portrait 
Michael Snape – Stuart Purves 
Nick Stathopoulos – The white shirt – portrait of Tané Andrews 
Oliver Watts – Dorian Gray (Eryn Jean Norvill) 
Peter Wegner – Portrait of Guy Warren at 100 (Winner: Archibald Prize 2021)
Mirra Whale – Repose 
Eunice Djerrkŋu Yunupiŋu – Me and my sisters

See also 

 Previous year: List of Archibald Prize 2020 finalists
 Next year: List of Archibald Prize 2022 finalists
 List of Archibald Prize winners

References

External links 

 Archibald Prize 2021 Finalists official website

2021
Archibald Prize
Archibald Prize
Archibald Prize 2021
Archibald Prize 2021
Archibald